Morpheus Descends is a death metal band that first formed in Middletown, New York in 1990 under the name of Morpheus. The band has undergone numerous lineup changes during their run, with their core lineup consisting of founding members Rob Yench and Sam Inzerra. The group initially broke up in 1998 due to a lack of interest in the project. However, in 2013 they reunited, and continue to play live shows. Morpheus Descends is considered to be an important band in the development of the New York death metal scene.

History

Initial run (1990–1998)
The band performed their first rehearsal on October 31, 1990, with a lineup consisting of bassist Ken Faggio, drummer Sam Inzerra, vocalist Craig Campbell, and guitarists Rob Yench and Steve Hanson. Before the formation of Morpheus Descends (who at this point were called Morpheus, a name inspired by the comic Sandman), Faggio and Yench were in the band Volatile Zylog, while Campbell, Hanson and Inzerra were in the band Infectious Waste. The two bands played a show together the previous summer. The band's early musical influences included Napalm Death, Black Sabbath, Death and Morbid Angel. The band recorded their first demo tape Accelerated Decrepitude in 1991. It contained tracks that would all later be released again as a 7" record under the title Adipocere in 1992 through Seraphic Decay Records.

The group were signed to JL America in 1992 and released their first full-length album Ritual of Infinity the same year. Composed of tracks recorded during different sessions, the album was released under the band name Morpheus Descends—the first recording by the group to be released under that name. It was also the first recording by the group to feature vocalist Jeff Riemer, who had joined the group after Campbell left. According to Yench, the band name change was made at the request of JL America, since an electronic group with the name Morpheus already existed. The ensuing tour for the album was financed and booked by the band themselves.

The group independently released the extended play Chronicles of the Shadowed Ones in 1994 which Yench described as "much darker and more doom-laden". For this recording, the band spent extra time in studio, as opposed to the "rushed" time schedule they had with their previous recordings. Chronicles of the Shadowed Ones is the only release by the group to feature guitarist Bryan Johnston, who replaced Steve Hanson when he left the group after the release of Ritual of Infinity. It is also the last album by the group to feature vocalist Jeff Riemer. The group issued their third extended play The Horror of the Truth in 1997 through Angel Dust Records, the only release by the group to feature vocalist/guitarist Tom Stevens and bassist Andy Newton. The group eventually broke up in 1998 due to creative differences, personal issues, and an overall lack of interest in the project.

Post-breakup activity (1998–2012)
After the band's break-up in 1998, members of the group went on to work on other projects. Both Stevens and Yench would go on to perform in Incantation. Yench is currently a member of the groups Mausoleum, Typhus, and Engorge. Inzerra plays in the bands Mortician and Funerus and was at one point a member of the crossover thrash group Generation Kill. Faggio plays in Rooms of Ruin and Cabal 34. Andy Newton joined the black metal band Fog under the nickname "Lord Typhus Mirinor".

Former vocalist Jeff Riemer died on August 30, 2005, of a heroin overdose.

Reunion (2013–present)
The band performed their first show since their break-up in 1998 with a lineup consisting of founding members Yench, Inzerra, Faggio and Campbell, and newly recruited guitarist Ed Winners in 2013. The idea to reunite was one that had stuck with the band since their initial dissolution. However, it was not until 2012 when Inzerra and Yench met at Maryland Deathfest when the idea was taken seriously. To celebrate the band's 25th anniversary in 2015, Dark Descent Records released the three-disc anthology box set From Blackened Crypts that contained the band's entire recorded discography, a DVD Visage of Malady containing live footage and interviews, and two newly recorded tracks. The two new tracks, "Oozing of the Urn" and "The King's Curse", were released as their own separate 7" record that same year under the same name. Webzine Metal Rules named From Blackened Crypts as the best box set of 2015. The 7" was mentioned in Death Metal Undereground's "Best Albums of 2015" feature.

The group has been touring regularly since their reunion and have announced plans to write and record more new material in the future.

Band members

Current members
Tim Rocheny – vocals (2015–present)
Rob Yench – guitar (1990–1998, 2013–present)
Ken Faggio – bass (1990–1993, 2013–present)
Adam Kegg – guitar (2015–present)
Sam Inzerra – drums (1990–1998, 2013–present)

Former members 
Craig Campbell – vocals (1990–1991, 2013–2015)
Ed Winter – guitar (2014–2015)
Tom Stevens – guitar, vocals (1995–1998)
Andy Newton – bass (1993–1998)
Bryan Johnston – guitar (1993–1995)
Jeff Riemer – vocals (1992–1995; died 2005)
Steve Hanson – guitar (1990–1993)

Timeline

Discography

Studio albums
Ritual of Infinity (1992)

Extended plays
Adipocere (1992)
Chronicles of the Shadowed Ones (1994)
The Horror of the Truth (1997)
From Blackened Crypts (2015)

Box sets
From Blackened Crypts (2015)

Demo albums
Accelerated Decrepitude (1991)
Corpse Under Glass (1992)
Cairn of Dumitru (1993)

References

External links
Morpheus Descends on Discogs
Morpheus Descends on Facebook

Musical groups established in 1990
Death metal musical groups from New York (state)